Oluwaseyi Abolaji (born May 6, 1983) is a former American soccer player. He and his brother, Oluwaseun Abolaji is the founder of Wilson's Juice Co, a lemonade juice company with a start-up of $10 in 2010 after his arrival to Nigeria.

Career
Abolaji spent four years of his college career at Stanford University where he made a total of 51 appearances for the Cardinal.  He also played professionally for California Cougars in the MISL and for Seattle Sounders in the USL First Division.

References

External links
Stanford University bio

1983 births
Living people
American men's soccer players
Stanford Cardinal men's soccer players
California Cougars players
Seattle Sounders (1994–2008) players
Association football defenders
Soccer players from Colorado
Major Indoor Soccer League (2001–2008) players
USL First Division players
Nigerian emigrants to the United States
People from Niger State
Sportspeople from Aurora, Colorado